Charles Meredyth (died 1710) was an Irish politician. 

Meredyth was the eldest son of Thomas Meredyth and Letitia Fortescue, and the grandson of Richard Meredith.

He was a Cornet in the The Lord General's Regiment of Foot Guards in 1661 and was serving in the Duke of Albemarle's Regiment of Horse in 1662. He was appointed High Sheriff of Meath on 23 November 1678. Meredyth sat in the Irish House of Commons as the Member of Parliament for Meath from 1692 to 1693. He then represented Kells from 1695 to 1699 and again between 1702 and his death in 1710.

He married firstly Anne Blayney in 1671, with whom he had Henry Meredyth, and married secondly Judith Savage in 1677, with whom he had Thomas Meredyth.

References

Year of birth unknown
1710 deaths
17th-century Anglo-Irish people
18th-century Anglo-Irish people
High Sheriffs of Meath
Irish MPs 1692–1693
Irish MPs 1695–1699
Irish MPs 1703–1713
Members of the Parliament of Ireland (pre-1801) for County Meath constituencies
Charles